is a railway station on the Nippō Main Line and Kitto Line in Miyakonojō, Miyazaki, Japan, operated by Kyushu Railway Company (JR Kyushu).

Station layout
The station has a Midori no Madoguchi staffed ticket office.

History
Japanese Government Railways opened Miyakonojō Station on 8 October 1913 as the eastern terminus of its then Miyazaki Line which it had been extending eastwards from  since 1912. By 21 September 1917, the track had reached  and line was renamed the Miyazaki Main Line. The entire stretch through Miyazaki, Miyakonojō to Yoshimatsu was then redesignated as part of the Nippō Main Line on 15 December 1923.

By this time, the extension of the track south and west towards  from Miyakonojō had also begun. On 14 January 1923, Japanese Government Railways opened the Shibushi Line from Miyakonojō through  to Sueyoshi (now closed). By 1932, various lines stretching to Kagoshima had been linked up and through-traffic had been achieved. The lines serving Miyakonojō were redesignated. The  stretch to Yoshimatsu (running generally northeast) was designated as the Kitto Line with Miyakonojō as the eastern terminus. The other tracks, with lines of various names now linked up to Kagoshima were designated as part of the Nippō Main Line.  With the privatization of Japanese National Railways, the successor to Japanese Government Railways, on 1 April 1987, the station came under the control of Kyushu Railway Company.

Passenger statistics
In fiscal 2016, the station was used by an average of 1,111 passengers daily (boarding passengers only), and it ranked 152nd among the busiest stations of JR Kyushu.

See also
 List of railway stations in Japan

References

External links

  

Railway stations in Miyazaki Prefecture
Stations of Kyushu Railway Company
Railway stations in Japan opened in 1913